The enzyme sinapine esterase (EC 3.1.1.49) catalyzes the reaction

sinapoylcholine + H2O  sinapate + choline

This enzyme belongs to the family of hydrolases, specifically those acting on carboxylic ester bonds.  The systematic name of this enzyme class is sinapoylcholine sinapohydrolase. This enzyme is also called aromatic choline esterase.  This enzyme participates in phenylpropanoid biosynthesis.

References

 

EC 3.1.1
Enzymes of unknown structure